Eva Jeanette Gustafsdotter (born 24 December 1965) is a Swedish politician for the Social Democratic party. Since 30 November 2021 she is the Minister of Culture in Magdalena Andersson's cabinet, replacing Amanda Lind.

Before being appointed as Minister of Culture, Gustafsdotter was the secretary-general of the Swedish Museums Association.  At Mid Sweden University she supplemented her studies with journalism between 1992 and 1994, and in 2020 she graduated from Luleå University of Technology as a subject teacher for upper secondary school.

References 

Swedish Social Democratic Party politicians
Women government ministers of Sweden
Swedish Ministers for Culture
21st-century Swedish women politicians
Living people
1965 births